Gyeongancheon is a river of South Korea. It is a tributary of the Han River. The stream has been studied for future potential climate, land use change and vegetation cover.

References

Rivers of South Korea